Jerry W. Baskerville (born November 10, 1951) is a retired American basketball player.

Born in Philadelphia, he played collegiately for the University of Nevada, Las Vegas and Temple University.

He played for the Philadelphia 76ers (1975–76) in the National Basketball Association for 21 games.

External links

1951 births
Living people
20th-century African-American sportspeople
21st-century African-American people
African-American basketball players
American men's basketball players
Basketball players from Philadelphia
Jersey Shore Bullets players
Philadelphia 76ers players
Rochester Zeniths players
Small forwards
Temple Owls men's basketball players
Undrafted National Basketball Association players
UNLV Runnin' Rebels basketball players
Wilkes-Barre Barons players